Virochannagar is a village located in Sanand taluka of Ahmedabad district, Gujarat, India. In the 2011 census it was reported as having a population of 7,081.

References

Villages in Ahmedabad district
Settlements in Gujarat